Shah Newaz is a Communist Party of Bangladesh politician and the former Member of Parliament of Jamalpur-4.

Career
Newaz was elected to parliament from Jamalpur-4 as a Communist Party of Bangladesh candidate in 1986.

References

Communist Party of Bangladesh politicians
Living people
3rd Jatiya Sangsad members
Year of birth missing (living people)